This is a list of publicly accessible, motorable passes in the Eastern Cape province, South Africa.

List of Passes in the Eastern Cape province

See also 
 Mountain Passes of South Africa

References 
 Wild Dog Adventure Riding, South Africa

Eastern Cape
Mountain passes
Mountain passes of Eastern Cape
Mountain passes of Eastern Cape